The Enfield Society, known as The Enfield Preservation Society until 2007, campaigns for "the conservation and enhancement of the civic and natural environments of the London Borough of Enfield and its immediate surrounding area".

History
The society was founded in 1936 as a direct result of a campaign organised by Ebenezer Rees, vicar of Christ Church, Chase Side, to prevent Enfield District Council building new offices on green fields at Chase Green, Chase Side. A public meeting was held at the Oddfellows Hall in Old Park Road, Enfield, which was attended by Sir Henry Bowles Bart., Lt. Col. R.V.K. Applin DSO member of Parliament for Enfield, G.W. Daisley vicar of Enfield, the reverend Rees and Mr Dudley Leggatt. The opposition to the idea caused the council to withdraw their plans.

In 1938 the society campaigned against the development of the Library Green, in Church Street, and more recently it campaigned to restore the derelict Broomfield House in Broomfield Park, Palmers Green, and helped the restoration of the New River in Enfield town.

In 2007, the society changed its name from The Enfield Preservation Society to The Enfield Society.

Organisation
The society is a registered charity No. 276451.

Selected publications
Pam, David. (1990) A History of Enfield Volume One - Before 1837: A Parish Near London.  
Pam, David. (1992) A History of Enfield Volume Two - 1837 to 1914: A Victorian Suburb. 
Pam, David. (1994) A History of Enfield Volume Three - 1914 to 1939: A Desirable Neighbourhood. 
Williams, R. (1997) A portrait of Gentleman's Row. 
Carter, Valerie. (2000) Treasures of Enfield: Discovering the Buildings of a London Borough. .
Smith, Monica. (2015) ''A History of Enfield Volume Four – 1939 to 1969: A Time of Change.

References 

Enfield, London
History of the London Borough of Enfield
London Borough of Enfield
1936 establishments in England
Charities based in London